Circle game may refer to:

 The Circle Game (poetry collection), a 1964 poetry collection by Margaret Atwood
 "The Circle Game" (song), a song written by Joni Mitchell
 covered by Buffy Sainte-Marie on her album Fire & Fleet & Candlelight (1967)
 covered by Tom Rush on the eponymous album The Circle Game (1968)
 sung by Joni Mitchell on her album Ladies of the Canyon (1970)
 "Circle Game" (song), a song on the Pink album Hurts 2B Human (2019)
 Children's game involving the OK gesture